"Try To Find Me" is a song by the Soviet rock band Gorky Park, released in 1990 as a single from the band's self-titled debut album. The song reached number 81 in the Billboard Hot 100, spending two weeks in the chart. This made the band the first Russian act ever to enter the Hot 100.

Track listings

Charts

References 

Gorky Park (band) songs
Vertigo Records singles
Mercury Records singles
PolyGram singles
1990 songs
1990 singles